Cape Catastrophe is a headland  in the Australian state of South Australia located at the southeast tip of Jussieu Peninsula on Eyre Peninsula. It is one of the natural features named by the British navigator Matthew Flinders in memory of the eight crew who were lost from a cutter that capsized sometime after being launched from HM Sloop Investigator to search for water on 21 February 1802.
Flinders also nominated the headland as being the western point of the mouth of Spencer Gulf.
It is currently located within the gazetted locality of Lincoln National Park and the protected area known as the Memory Cove Wilderness Protection Area.

References

External links
Shipwrecks - Cape Catastrophe

Headlands of South Australia
Eyre Peninsula
Spencer Gulf